Mock the Week is a satirical panel show that airs on BBC Two. The first episode was broadcast on 5 June 2005. As of 30 September 2022, 193 regular episodes and 36 clip shows (fifteen of which were Christmas/New Year specials) have been aired across eighteen series; 229 episodes in total (not including the 2011 Comic Relief special or "Mock the Week Looks Back At...").

All episodes are approximately 30 minutes long. The original lineup was Dara Ó Briain as host, with Hugh Dennis, Frankie Boyle and one guest panellist on one side, and Rory Bremner and two guest panellists on the other. Bremner left after series 2 and was replaced by Andy Parsons, and Russell Howard became a regular panellist the following series. Boyle left after series 7 and was replaced by a series of guests until Chris Addison took his seat permanently in the second half of series 10. Howard was absent for the last episodes of series 9 and first half of series 10 due to other filming commitments, and was confirmed to have left the panel in August 2011. Addison was not present for the second half of series 12 due to other commitments, and subsequently did not return for series 13, with his seat once again becoming a guest slot. In October 2015, Parsons announced he was quitting after ten years; he was not replaced as a regular.

On 2 August 2022, the BBC announced that series 21 would be the final series. The last ever "new" episode of Mock the Week broadcast on 21 October 2022; the remaining two shows are clip shows, retrospectives of the entire 17 year run.

Episode list
The coloured backgrounds denote the result of each of the shows:

 – indicates Hugh's team won
 – indicates Rory's / Andy's / the guest team won
 – indicates the game ended in a draw or with neither team being declared the winner
Viewing figures are from BARB.

Series 1 (2005)

Series 2 (2006)

Series 3 (2006)

Series 4 (2007)

Series 5 (2007)

Series 6 (2008)

Series 7 (2009)

Series 8 (2010)

Series 9 (2010)

Comic Relief special (2011)

Series 10 (2011)

Series 11 (2012)

Mock the Week Looks Back At... (2013)

Series 12 (2013)

Series 13 (2014)

Series 14 (2015)

Series 15 (2016)

Series 16 (2017)

Series 17 (2018)
From episode 7 onwards, viewing figures include four-screen data.

Series 18 (2019)

Series 19 (2020–21)

Series 20 (2021)

Series 21 (2022)

Scores

Despite not being a serious competition, points are awarded at the end of each round and a winner is announced at the conclusion of each episode. Below is the number of series and episode wins by each of the regular panellists. As Andy Parsons took over from Rory Bremner, both of their scores are combined and shown individually. Despite Chris Addison, Frankie Boyle and Russell Howard all being regulars at certain times, they are not listed in the headers; instead, their wins are combined with the panellist who was seen as their captain during their tenures.

Footnotes

References

External links

BBC-related lists
Lists of British comedy television series episodes
Lists of British non-fiction television series episodes